Jerred Smithson (born February 4, 1979) is a Canadian former professional ice hockey centre who played in the National Hockey League (NHL).

Playing career
Undrafted, Smithson played in the Western Hockey League with the Calgary Hitmen before he signed his first NHL contract as a free agent with the Los Angeles Kings. 

Smithson scored the game-winning goal for the Nashville Predators in Game 5 of the 2011 Stanley Cup Playoffs quarterfinals to beat the Anaheim Ducks 3-2. The Predators went on to defeat the Ducks in 6 games to preserve their first ever playoff  series win.

On February 24, 2012, Smithson was traded by the Predators to the Florida Panthers for a 2012 sixth round draft pick.

April 3, 2013 he was acquired by the Edmonton Oilers from the Florida Panthers in exchange for a fourth round pick in the 2013 Draft.

As a free agent leading into the 2013–14 season, Smithson signed a professional try-out contract with the Toronto Marlies of the American Hockey League on October 16, 2013.

After 7 games with the Marlies, on November 6, 2013, Smithson returned to the NHL in signing a one-year contract with parent club, the Toronto Maple Leafs. Smithson later made his Leafs debut on November 8, 2013. Smithson was waived by the Maple Leafs on December 4, 2013, and after clearing waivers reported to the AHL Toronto Marlies.

After sitting out the 2014–15 season as a free agent, Smithson announced a comeback to professional hockey in agreeing to a one-year contract with Danish club, Herning Blue Fox of the Metal Ligaen on July 25, 2015. In his solitary season abroad in 2015–16, Smithson contributed with 24 points in 33 games, helping the Blue Fox to the finals in the post-season with 7 points in 19 playoff games. He announced his retirement from professional hockey following the season.

Career statistics

References

External links

1979 births
Living people
Calgary Hitmen players
Canadian ice hockey right wingers
Edmonton Oilers players
Florida Panthers players
Herning Blue Fox players
Los Angeles Kings players
Lowell Lock Monsters players
Manchester Monarchs (AHL) players
Milwaukee Admirals players
Nashville Predators players
Toronto Maple Leafs players
Toronto Marlies players
Trenton Titans players
Ice hockey people from British Columbia
Undrafted National Hockey League players
Sportspeople from Vernon, British Columbia